Harry Daniel Payne (1891–1987) was an American architect and engineer; protégé of noted St. Louis Architect, William Ittner. Payne is most known for building designs in the U.S. State of Texas after 1926, but before this as a member of the Ittner Firm, he designed schools and hospitals in other states. Payne was born in St. Louis, Missouri, and was trained at Washington University in St. Louis.  Upon graduation, he attended Fort Sheridan Officers Training School, and served in World War I in Company H, 320th Infantry, 80th Division. On September 25–26, 1918 he fought in the Meuse-Argone Offensive, leading men of H Company to take Dead Man's Hill (Le Mort Homme). Payne received a battlefield commission to Captain just before the Armistice. He returned to St. Louis after the war to work with the Ittner form until 1926. That year he was recruited by Houston School Board to design all new schools for the city. After this contract was completed he went on to design schools, jails, office buildings, stadiums, houses and museums in Texas including for Anahuac ISD, Beaumont ISD, Corpus Christi ISD, Houston ISD, and Huntsville ISD.

After December 7, 1941, Payne tried to secure the renewal of his WWI Commission as Captain, but was refused because of disabilities resulting from injuries in the First World War. He found an outlet for his desire to serve by applying at Brown Shipbuilding in Houston where he worked on the design of destroyers, frigates escorts and landing craft. The USS Stewart is one surviving example of this work.

Payne was an active member of the American Institute of Architects, and was awarded the Edward C. Kemper Award by the organization in 1962.

List of works built

River Oaks Elementary (1926) Houston
Wharton Elementary (1926) Houston
DeZavalla Elementary (1926) Houston
Eugene Field Elementary (1926) Houston
Andrew P. Briscoe Elementary (1926) Houston
Rufus Cage Elementary (1926) Houston
Edgar Allan Poe School (1926) Houston
Ashbel Smith Elementary (1927) Houston
Robert Louis Stevenson Elementary (1927) Houston
Hogg Junior High School (1928) Goose Creek (Baytown) 
Cedar Bayou High School (1928) Cedar Bayou
Robert E. Lee High School (1928) Goose Creek (Baytown) 
Governor William P. Hobby House (1928, 1936, 1939) Houston
M. C. Parker & Co. Offices (1928) Houston
Richmond Home Economics Cottage (1928) Richmond, Texas
Alta Loma/Santa Fe High School (1928) Santa Fe
Gasow-Howard Motor Co. (1929) Beaumont
Beaumont High School (1929) Beaumont
Wheatley High School (1929) Houston
William Gaston Love Elementary (1929) Houston
El Campo Ag Shop and Laboratory (1929) El Campo
Deer Park High School (1930)
Charles Bender High School (1930) Humble
Bay City High School (1930) Bay City
Barbers Hill High School (1930) 
Midfield Common School No. 10 (1930) Midfield, Texas
Clifford Smith House (1930) Houston
Channelview Elementary (1930) 
Harris County Elementary School #18 (1930) Houston
Edward Griffey House (1930) Houston
Huntsville High School and athletic field (1931) Huntsville
Harry F. Estill Home (1931) Huntsville
A. C. Standley House (1931) Huntsville
Bay City M. E. Church Educational Building (1931) Bay City
Matagorda County Jail (1931) Bay City
LaWard Elementary/High School (1931) LaWard
Dodge Rural High School (1931) Dodge, Texas
Edward Boettcher House (1933) Huntsville
Crabbs Prairie School #1 (1933) Huntsville
Markham High School (1934) Markham
Nelson Stiles House (1934) Baytown
William C. Holt House (1934) Angleton
Blessing High School (1934) 
Walker County Jail (1934), Huntsville
John Seale Junior High School (1934) Corpus Christi
Markham High School (1934) 
Rusk State Hospital Ward Building (1935) Rusk
August Kraft House (1935) Bay Villa (Baytown) 
Garwood High School (1935) 
Almeda High School (1935) 
Albert M. Ball House (1935) Houston
Mirabeau B. Lamar High School (1935) Houston; with John F. Staub, Kenneth Franzheim, Louis A. Glover, and Lamar Q. Cato
Palacios High School (1935,1936) Palacios
H. Gillmore Webster House (1935) Houston
Sam Houston Memorial Museum Rotunda (1936), Huntsville
J. S. Palmer House (1935) Baytown
W. W. Floyd House (1936) Huntsville
Hockley Rural High School#3 Auditorium (1936)
New Caney High School (1936)
Center High School (1936) Center, Texas
Anahuac High School (1936) 
C. M. Hurst House (1937) Baytown
Don S. Freese House (1937) Baytown
A. E. Lindquist House (1937) Baytown
Raymond P. Elledge House (1937) Baytown
Stuart macKay House (1937) Baytown
Fred Page House (1937) Houston
W. O. Cox House (1937) Houston
H. F. Ireland House (1937) Houston
Sam Houston State College Chapel Improvements (1937) Huntsville
Sam Houston State College Farm Boys Dormitory (1937) Huntsville
Sam Houston State College open air theater (Greek amphitheater) (1937) Huntsville
E. Q. Camp House (1937) Baytown
Hugh G. Henderson office and warehouse (1937) Houston
H. W. Wells House (1938) Ganado
W. W. Harris House (1938) Baytown
Angleton High School Gymnasium (1938) 
Huntsville M. E. Church south addition (1938) Huntsville
Sam Houston State College Andrew Jackson Hall (1938) Huntsville
N. D. Stiles Lumber Co. (1938) Baytown
Deer Park Physical Education Building (1938)
Max Rodgers House (1938) Huntsville, Texas
Bering Memorial M. E. Church (1938) Houston
A. A. Wells House (1938) Houston, Texas
Harry D. Payne House (1939) Houston, Texas
Whitehead House (1939) Houston, Texas
Markham High School additions (1939) 
Sam Houston State College Stadium (1940) Huntsville
Elizabeth Elliott Hall (1940) Huntsville
F. H. Ireland House (1940) Houston
Ben D. Ward House, (1940) Baytown
Hugh Henderson House (1940 ) Houston
Albert Wadsworth House (1941) Bay City
Air Training Center (1941) Huntsville
Jeppesen Gymnasium (1941) Houston
John O'Quinn Field at Robertson Stadium (1941) Houston
R. F. Parsons House (1941) Houston
Sam Houston State College improvements to Old Main (1942) Huntsville
Sam Houston State College Classroom Building (1942) Huntsville
Sam Houston State College Halley Hall Science Building (1942) Huntsville
Sam Houston State College Campus Development Plan (1943) Huntsville
Rugley Motor Co. (19450 Bay City
Sam Houston State College Apartments (1945) Huntsville
Sam Houston State College Josey School of Vocational Arts (1945) Huntsville
Bay City Bank and Trust Co. (1945) 
Smither Office Building (1945) Huntsville
Palacios Hospital (1944) 
Sam Houston State College conversion of P.O.W. Camp to Country Campus (1946) Huntsville
First National Bank of Bay City (1947) Bay City
Deer Park Comprehensive Building (1947)
W. W. Harris House (1947) Baytown
Herbert C. May House (1948) Houston
Deer Park Lynchburg Elementary (1948)
Christ Presbyterian Church school building (1948) Houston
Hugh Henderson Laundry Equipment office and warehouse (1948) Houston
Deer Park High School swimming pool (1949) Deer Park
Nelson D. Stiles Store Shop and Offices (1950) Baytown
Deer Park lunchroom, music building, football field, auto mechanics shop (1950) 
Deer Park San Jacinto Elementary (1950)
Christ Presbyterian Church Sanctuary (1952) Houston
Robert Earl Wolters house (1952) Columbus
Columbus State Bank (1952) Columbus
Denver Presbyterian Church Sanctuary (1953) Denver, Co. 
Spring Branch Presbyterian Church fellowship hall (1954) Spring Branch
F. H. Luther garden room (1955) Houston
Henry Beck garden room and air conditioning (1955) Houston
Norman Way plant room (1955) Houston
Dr. T. P. Shearer House (1959) Houston
Tyler C. Clark House (1959) Columbus
Cohen Estates Abe Gollob (1959) 
Bering Bearing Service (1959) Houston
Spring Branch Presbyterian Church classrooms (1960) Spring Branch
Harold Steadman Credit Co. (1963) LaBranch, Texas
Henry J. Beck Kitchen (1963) 
Bering Bearing Service Accounting Dept building and warehouse (1966) Houston

References

1891 births
1987 deaths
20th-century American architects
Art Deco architects
Architects from St. Louis
Sam Fox School of Design & Visual Arts alumni
Architects from Texas
People from Houston
American military personnel of World War I